Sodium methylsulfinylmethylide (also called NaDMSO or dimsyl sodium) is the sodium salt of the conjugate base of dimethyl sulfoxide. This unusual salt has some uses in organic chemistry as a base and nucleophile.

Since the first publication in 1965 by Corey et al., a number of additional uses for this reagent have been identified.

Preparation
Sodium methylsulfinylmethylide is prepared by heating sodium hydride or sodium amide in DMSO

CH3SOCH3 + NaH → CH3SOCH2−Na+ + H2
CH3SOCH3 + NaNH2 → CH3SOCH2−Na+ + NH3

Reactions

As a Base
The pKa of DMSO is 35, which leads NaDMSO to be a powerful Brønsted base. NaDMSO is used in the generation of phosphorus and sulfur ylides. NaDMSO in DMSO is especially convenient in the generation of dimethyloxosulfonium methylide and dimethylsulfonium methylide.

Reaction with esters
NaDMSO condenses with esters (1) to form β-ketosulfoxides (2), which can be useful intermediates. Reduction of β-ketosulfoxides with aluminium amalgam gives methyl ketones (3). Reaction with alkyl halides followed by elimination gives α,β-unsaturated ketones (4). β-ketosulfoxides can also be used in the Pummerer rearrangement to introduce nucleophiles alpha to a carbonyl (5).

References

External links
 
 

Reagents for organic chemistry
Organosodium compounds